Ariana Catrina Calderón Valdez (born 12 May 1990) is an American-born Mexican former footballer who last played as forward for Liga MX Femenil club CF Monterrey and the Mexico women's national team.

References

External links
 
 
 

1990 births
Living people
Citizens of Mexico through descent
Mexican women's footballers
Women's association football forwards
Mexico women's international footballers
Kansallinen Liiga players
Kokkola Futis 10 players
Ariana Calderón
Ariana Calderón
Ariana Calderón
Ariana Calderón
Toppserien players
Medkila IL (women) players
Liga MX Femenil players
C.F. Monterrey (women) players
Mexican expatriate women's footballers
Mexican expatriate sportspeople in Finland
Expatriate women's footballers in Finland
Mexican expatriate sportspeople in Iceland
Expatriate women's footballers in Iceland
Mexican expatriate sportspeople in Norway
Expatriate women's footballers in Norway
American women's soccer players
Soccer players from Sacramento, California
American sportspeople of Mexican descent
LIU Brooklyn Blackbirds women's soccer players
Women's Premier Soccer League players
California Storm players
National Women's Soccer League players
Houston Dash players
American expatriate women's soccer players
American expatriate sportspeople in Finland
American expatriate sportspeople in Iceland
American expatriate sportspeople in Norway